Vasseur is a French surname. Notable people with the surname include:

Adolphe Bazaine-Vasseur (1809–1893), French railway engineer
Alain Vasseur (born 1948), French cyclist
Alexis Vasseur, French-American mathematician
Cédric Vasseur (born 1970), French cyclist, son of Alain
Dominique Henri Vasseur (born 1951), French-American art museum curator
Flore Vasseur (born 1973), French filmmaker, novelist, journalist and enterpreneur
Frédéric Vasseur (born 1968), French motor sport engineer
Gaston Vasseur (1904–1971), French linguist
Isabelle Vasseur (born 1959), member of the National Assembly of France
Jean-Luc Vasseur (born 1969), French football manager
Leo Vasseur, Canadian politician
Léon Vasseur (1844–1917), French composer, organist and conductor
Louis Vasseur (1885–1968), French athlete
Noel Le Vasseur (1798–1879), trader and merchant from Canada
Paul Vasseur (1884–1971), French swimmer and water polo player
Peter Le Vasseur (born 1938), artist from Guernsey
Philippe Vasseur (born 1943), French politician

See also 
 Levasseur (surname)

French-language surnames